A rhombus is a geometric shape often colloquially described as a diamond.

Rhombus may also refer to:


Music
Rhombus (band), a roots reggae band from New Zealand
Rhombus (UK band), British gothic rock band
Bullroarer, a musical instrument

Other uses
Reticulum, a southern constellation, once called Rhombus
Rhombus formation, a troop formation
Rhombus Media, a Canadian film and television production company
 Reusable Orbital Module, Booster, and Utility Shuttle (ROMBUS), a proposed reusable single-stage-to-orbit space launch vehicle

See also 
Rhombic (disambiguation)
Rhumb (disambiguation)